The Safety Harbor site is an archaeological site in Philippe Park at 2525 Philippe Parkway in Safety Harbor, Florida, United States.  It is the type site for the Safety Harbor culture, and includes the largest remaining mound in the Tampa Bay area.  It was designated a National Historic Landmark in 1964.

Description
The Safety Harbor site is a major feature of Philippe Park. The site consists of the large temple mound, one smaller burial mound and two shell middens. It is built out of a series layers, alternating shells and sand. Archaeologists have uncovered features interpreted as post holes in the summit area, suggestive that a structure once stood there, either a residence or temple structure. There are also layers of clay, which are thought to represent levels that may have also been used in some way.

The site is open to visitors during the daylight hours. In addition to the mounds, the park has walking paths, picnic areas, a boat ramp, fishing, and scenic views.

Archaeological significance
The site was documented as being occupied by early Spanish explorers of the region, who described it as the capital city of the  Tocobaga people.  Contact with these explorers probably introduced European diseases, which decimated the population and led to the site's abandonment, probably by 1700.  It was first brought to the attention of archaeologists as early as 1880, but the first formal excavations took place only in 1929.  Twentieth-century excavations, both sanctioned and illegal, resulted in the complete excavation of a burial mound which stood nearby.  The county acquired the property in 1948, and has conducted investigations into the site since then.

The site is the southernmost in Florida that exhibits the influence of Mississippian culture.  Pottery finds at the site share characteristics with the contemporaneous Fort Walton culture.

See also
List of National Historic Landmarks in Florida
National Register of Historic Places listings in Pinellas County, Florida
Odet Philippe

References

External links
 Pinellas County listings at Florida's Office of Cultural and Historical Programs
Indian Mound 360° View

Archaeological type sites
Archaeological sites on the National Register of Historic Places in Florida
Mounds in Florida
National Historic Landmarks in Florida
National Register of Historic Places in Pinellas County, Florida
Native American history of Florida
Florida Native American Heritage Trail
1966 establishments in Florida
Protected areas established in 1966